The San Pablo Arts District (SPAD)  is a nascent arts district along the San Pablo Avenue corridor, between 53rd and 67th Streets in the Golden Gate neighborhood of Oakland, California.

Art Galleries in the SPAD

 Blank Space (2006-2010)
 The Compound Art Studios
 Create In Clay, 5512 San Pablo Ave, Oakland, CA
 Emeryville Art Exhibition, featuring works of nearly ninety artists and craftspeople - both established and emerging - who live or work in Emeryville. The Annual Exhibition is hosted by a different location each year. 2013 will be the 27th edition of the event.
 The Grease Diner, 6604 San Pablo Avenue, Oakland, CA. The Grease Diner provides screen printing services and classes.
 Lottie Rose Art House (Firehouse Collective) https://www.facebook.com/firehouselottierosehouse/
 Mysterious Creatures Art Collective/Cuddle Factory, 6610 San Pablo Ave., Oakland, California. Metal art, jewelry-making and metalwork classes, open studios.
 Sight School
 Yzzo Studios, 6610 San Pablo Avenue, Oakland, CA 94608. Art from recycled metal: steel sculptures. custom window security, furniture.

Independent cafes exhibiting art in the SPAD

The Actual Cafe
Bacano Bakery 
Farley's On 65th
Ruby's Cafe
Tribu

References

External links
Circa 2012 San Francisco Chronicle article on businesses of the San Pablo Corridor
San Pablo Arts District home page
San Francisco Chronicle review of San Pablo Avenue, Golden Gate district, Oakland  (January 2015) 

Neighborhoods in Oakland, California
Arts districts